Pineview (also spelled Pine View) is a neighbourhood in Beacon Hill-Cyrville Ward in the east end of Ottawa, Ontario, Canada. Prior to amalgamation in 2001, the neighbourhood was part of the City of Gloucester. As of the Canada 2021 Census, the neighbourhood had a population of 6,179.

It is bounded by the Queensway on the north, Highway 417 to the west, the Greenbelt on the east and Innes Road to the south. Its adjacent neighbourhoods are Beacon Hill, Blackburn Hamlet and Cyrville.

Notable locations in Pineview include:
The Telesat building
The former City of Gloucester City Hall
John Paul II Catholic School
Ecole des Pins
Pineview Golf Course

The neighbourhood is also across from a large commercial area of big box and large department stores such as The Brick, Mark's Warehouse, Petsmart, United Furniture Warehouse, Costco, and Home Depot on Innes Road between Blair Road and Highway 417.

History
Pineview was formerly known as Seguin Heights, named after Joseph-Arthur Seguin of Dalkeith, Ontario, an early landowner.

See also
List of Ottawa neighbourhoods

External links

References

Neighbourhoods in Ottawa